W.M.D. is an American war drama/comedy film directed by Richard Halpern and starring Tom Kiesche, John Posey, Weetus Cren, Leila Birch, John Brickner and Kate Mines. It was produced by Jeffrey S. Magnussen, Ian Truitner and Richard Halpern, and written by Mike Le and Ian Truitner.

Plot 
The Iraq War remains one of the most controversial U.S. overseas engagements of past 30 years. The instability it wrought on the region gave rise to ISIS and a host of other problems to Iraq and surrounding countries. And yet the primary rationales for going to war—WMDs and Saddam Hussein's links to Al Qaeda, have been proven false. Streets across America now have an endemic problem of veterans with PTSD, leading to violence, suicide and homelessness.

In an alternate 2007 reality, a group of disgruntled soldiers stationed in Iraq kidnap the visiting U.S. President, and interrogate him using the same techniques they were trained to inflict on Hussein's old cohorts and other terror 'suspects'. Their purpose is to extract from the president the real reasons for the Iraq invasion, as they know by now the stated reasons were bogus. The soldiers have a very limited amount of time to complete this fateful mission though, as the full force of the United States military is deployed to extract the President from captivity no matter what the cost.

Cast 

 Tom Kiesche as Captain Hank Garrison
 John Posey as The President
 Jessica Rizo as Asia Velasquez
 Weetus Cren as Sergeant Downy
 Leila Birch as Melody Stone
 John Brickner as Private First Class Riggs
 Kate Mines as Alexandra Tartakoff
 Jeff Prewett as Agent Stenson
 Ahmed Best as News Reporter
 Jeff Prewett as Agent Stenson
 Chris Torres as Steve
 Roy Abramsohn as Artichoke Anchor
 Victoria Barabas as Shawn Sanders
 Albert Kuo as Some Guy
 Darrell Britt-Gibson as Other Guy
 Mark Chaet as Francis McCarthy
 Scott Hoxby as Whit Whitley
 T.W. Leshner as Darrell
 Anastasia Roussel as Laura Reed
 Kerry Stein as Dr. Frieberg
 David Trice as Gerald Jones
 Jared Ward as Rupert Brannigan
 Joseph Will as David Smiliski

Release 
The film premiered in 2013 at Marché du Film at the Cannes Film Festival and was distributed by Indican Pictures in 2015.

References

External links 

 
 

2013 films
American war films
American independent films
2010s English-language films
2010s American films